Euphrytus intermedius is a species of leaf beetle. It is found in Mexico and Arizona.

References

Further reading

 

Eumolpinae
Articles created by Qbugbot
Beetles described in 1890
Taxa named by Martin Jacoby
Beetles of North America